The Arkansas-Robinson half dollar was a special issue of the Arkansas Centennial half dollar, minted in 1936 and featuring a different design.

The coin featured Joseph Taylor Robinson, who represented Arkansas in the U.S. Senate at the time.  He was the third of four living persons depicted on U.S. coinage.

See also
 List of United States commemorative coins and medals (1930s)
 Half dollar (United States coin)

References

External links
 

Birds in art
Early United States commemorative coins
Fifty-cent coins
Economy of Arkansas